Sergei Golubitsky (Romanization of Ukrainian ; , tr. ; born 20 December 1969) is a Ukrainian fencer. He won three straight world championships in men's foil. He now lives in United States, where he runs the Golubitsky Fencing Center in Tustin, CA. He designed a fencing blade for the Leon Paul company. He wrote his autobiography in 2004, Fencing Is My Life. The book was translated into French and published in France in 2013 under the title L'escrime dans la peau.

Career highlights

2000 Olympics: 5th Place (Australia)
1999 World Champion (Korea)
World Cup Champion (end of season points leader)
Super Masters: Gold Medal (Italy)
1998 World Champion (Switzerland)
1997 World Champion (South Africa)
Universiade: Silver Medal (Italy)
European Championships: Silver Medal (Poland)
Awarded with Order of the President of Ukraine
1996 Olympics: 6th Place (USA)
1995 World Championships: Bronze Medal (Netherlands)
European Champion (Hungary)
1994 World Cup Champion (end of season points leader)
1993 Universiade: Gold Medal (USA)
World Championships: Silver Medal (Germany)
World Cup Champion (end of season points leader)
1992 Olympics: Silver Medal (Spain)
World Cup Champion (end of season points leader)
1991 Cup of Ukraine: Gold Medal
Cup of the USSR: Gold Medal
1990 World Championships: Bronze Medal by Team (France)
European Cup: Gold Medal (France)
1989 World Champion by Team (USA)
1985 Cup of Ukraine: Gold Medal

References

External links 
 
 
 
 

1969 births
Living people
Soviet male foil fencers
Ukrainian male foil fencers
Fencers at the 1992 Summer Olympics
Fencers at the 1996 Summer Olympics
Fencers at the 2000 Summer Olympics
Olympic fencers of the Unified Team
Olympic fencers of Ukraine
Olympic silver medalists for the Unified Team
Olympic medalists in fencing
Sportspeople from Kyiv
Medalists at the 1992 Summer Olympics
Universiade medalists in fencing
Universiade gold medalists for Ukraine
Universiade silver medalists for Ukraine
Recipients of the Order of Merit (Ukraine), 3rd class
Medalists at the 1997 Summer Universiade